Lilyan Tashman (October 23, 1896 – March 21, 1934) was an American actress. Tashman was best known for her supporting roles as tongue-in-cheek villainesses or playing the vindictive "other woman". She made 66 films over the course of her Hollywood career, and although she never obtained superstar status, her cinematic performances are described as "sharp, clever and have aged little over the decades."

Tall, blonde, and slender with fox-like features and a throaty voice, Tashman freelanced as a fashion and artist's model in New York City. By 1914, she was an experienced vaudevillian, appearing in Ziegfeld Follies between 1916 and 1918. In 1921 Tashman made her film debut in Experience, and over the next decade and a half she appeared in numerous silent films. With her husky contralto singing voice she easily navigated the transition to sound film.

Tashman married vaudevillian Al Lee in 1914, but they divorced in 1921. She married actor Edmund Lowe in 1925, and her wardrobe and lavish parties became the talk of the town.

She died of cancer in New York City on March 21, 1934, at the age of 37. Her last film, Frankie and Johnny, was released posthumously in 1936.

Family 
Lilyan Tashman was born the tenth and youngest child of a Jewish family in Brooklyn, New York, the daughter of Rose (née Cook), who was born in Germany, and Maurice Tashman, a clothing manufacturer from
Białystok, Poland. She freelanced as a fashion and artist's model while attending Girl's High School in Brooklyn and eventually entered vaudeville. In 1914, aged 17, she married fellow vaudevillian Al Lee, but the two separated in 1920 and divorced in 1921.

Professional life 
Lilyan Tashman's entertainment career began in vaudeville. By 1914, aged 17, she was an experienced performer, appearing in Song Revue in Milwaukee, Wisconsin, with rising stars Eddie Cantor and Al Lee. In 1916, she played Viola in a Shakespeare-inspired number for the Ziegfeld Follies and remained with the Follies for the 1917 and 1918 seasons. In 1919, producer David Belasco gave her a supporting role in Avery Hopwood's comedy The Gold Diggers. The show ran two years, with Tashman acting as an understudy, and occasionally filling in, for star Ina Claire.

In 1921, Tashman made her film debut playing Pleasure in an allegorical segment of Experience, and when The Gold Diggers closed she appeared in the plays The Garden of Weeds and Madame Pierre. In 1922, she had a small role in the Mabel Normand film Head Over Heels. Her personal and professional lives in 1922 were not entirely satisfactory (best friend Edmund Lowe moved to Hollywood, for example, and she was fired from Madame Pierre), so she relocated to California and quickly found work in films. In 1924, she appeared in five films (including a cinematic adaptation of The Garden of Weeds) and received good reviews for Nellie, the Beautiful Cloak Model and Winner Take All. She freelanced, moving from studio to studio, but signed a long-term contract in 1931 with Paramount. She made nine films for the studio.

In 1925, she appeared in 10 films, including Pretty Ladies with Joan Crawford and Myrna Loy. From 1926 to 1929, she appeared in numerous films, became a valued supporting player, and starred in the independent Rocking Moon (1926) and The Woman Who Did Not Care (1927). She played supporting roles in Ernst Lubitsch's farce So This Is Paris (1926), Camille with Norma Talmadge (1926), A Texas Steer with Will Rogers (1927), director Dorothy Arzner's Manhattan Cocktail (1928), and Hardboiled (1929). Her Variety reviews were good.

She easily managed the transition to sound films, making a total of 28, and appeared in some of the very first, including United Artists's Bulldog Drummond (1929), The Trial of Mary Dugan (1929), the now-lost color musical Gold Diggers of Broadway (1929), and New York Nights (1930) with Norma Talmadge. She starred as a murderess in the melodrama Murder by the Clock, as a self-sacrificing mother in The Road to Reno (1931), and as a chorus girl in Wine, Women and Song (1933). In 1932, her health began to fail, but she appeared in The Wiser Sex, Those We Love, the film on the Russian Revolution, Scarlet Dawn, Mama Loves Papa with Charlie Ruggles (1933),, and the musical Too Much Harmony (1933). In early 1934, she appeared in Riptide with Norma Shearer. Her last film, Frankie and Johnny, was released posthumously in 1936. Director George Cukor described Tashman as "a very diverting creature [...] outrageous and cheerful and goodhearted."

Personal life 
On September 21, 1925, Tashman married her longtime friend, actor Edmund Lowe. The two became the darlings of Hollywood reporters and were touted in fan magazines as having "the ideal marriage". Tashman was described by reporter Gladys Hall as "the most gleaming, glittering, moderne, hard-surfaced, and distingué woman in all of Hollywood".  The couple entertained lavishly at "Lilowe", their Beverly Hills home, and their weekly party invitations were highly sought after. Her wardrobe cost $1 million, and women around the world clamored for copies of her hats, gowns, and jewelry. Servants were ordered to serve her cats afternoon tea, and for Easter brunch she had her dining room painted dark blue to provide a contrast to her blonde hair. She once painted her Malibu home red and white, asked her guests to wear red and white, and even dyed the toilet paper red and white. 
Seventy years after her death, a book author named E.J. Fleming claimed that Edmund Lowe was a homosexual and that Tashman was a lesbian. However, fan magazine writers and newspaper columnists made no mention of such claims during Tashman's lifetime or for seventy years after her death.

Death 

In 1932, Tashman entered the hospital in New York City for an appendectomy that is now considered a concealment for abdominal cancer. She left the hospital thin and weak. Although she made five films in her last years, performing with her usual artistry and professionalism, she weakened significantly in the months following her hospitalization, and her role in Riptide was trimmed because of her ever-worsening health.

In February 1934, she flew to New York City to film Frankie and Johnny for All Star Productions (released by Republic Pictures) but her condition necessitated a week of rest in Connecticut with Lowe. She resumed work in March, completing her film role on March 8 and then appearing at the Israel Orphan's Home benefit on March 10. When she entered the hospital for surgery on March 16, it was too late for the doctors to help her.

Tashman died of cancer at Doctor's Hospital in New York City on March 21, 1934 at the age of 37. Her funeral was held on March 22 in New York City synagogue Temple Emanu-El with Sophie Tucker, Mary Pickford, Fanny Brice, Cecil Beaton, Jack Benny, and other distinguished celebrities in attendance. Eddie Cantor delivered the eulogy. The burial in Brooklyn's Washington Cemetery attracted 10,000 fans, mourners, and curious onlookers; it became a near riot when people were injured and a gravestone was toppled. Tashman left no will, but the distribution of her $31,000 in cash and $121,000 in furs and jewels provoked contentious discussion among her husband and sisters, Hattie and Jennie. Her last film, Frankie and Johnny, was released posthumously in May 1936 with her role as Nellie Bly cut to a cameo.

Filmography

References

External links 

 
 
 
 Lilyan Tashman Photo Gallery
 Photographs and literature
 

1896 births
1934 deaths
American film actresses
American musical theatre actresses
American silent film actresses
Jewish American actresses
Musicians from Brooklyn
Vaudeville performers
Ziegfeld girls
20th-century American actresses
20th-century American singers
20th-century American women singers
Girls' High School alumni
Deaths from cancer in New York (state)
20th-century American Jews